The Girls' Doubles tournament of the 2015 BWF World Junior Championships is held on November 10–15. The defending champion of the last edition is Chen Qingchen / Jia Yifan from China.

Seeded

  Chen Qingchen / Jia Yifan (champion)
  Kader Inal / Fatma Nur Yavuz (fourth round)
  Julie Dawall Jakobsen / Ditte Soby Hansen (fourth round)
  Ruethaichanok Laisuan / Kilasu Ostermeyer (fourth round)
  Marsheilla Gischa Islami / Rahmadhani Hastiyanti Putri (quarter-final)
  Kristin Kuuba / Helina Ruutel (fourth round)
  Mychelle Chrystine Bandaso / Serena Kani (third round)
  Apriani Rahayu / Jauza Fadhila Sugiarto (fourth round)
  Bengisu Ercetin / Nazlican Inci (third round)
  Du Yue / Li Yinhui
  Rawimon Iamratanamaetheekul / Supamart Mingchua (fourth round)
  Nami Matsuyama / Chiharu Shida (semi-final)
  Delphine Delrue / Yaëlle Hoyaux (third round)
  Elaine Chua Yi Ling / Crystal Wong Jia Ying (second round)
  Vimala Heriau / Margot Lambert (second round)
  Chen Wan-ting / Lee Chia-hsin (semi-final)

Draw

Finals

Top Half

Section 1

Section 2

Section 3

Section 4

Bottom Half

Section 5

Section 6

Section 7

Section 8

References
Main Draw

2015 BWF World Junior Championships
2015 in youth sport